UDLP may refer to:

United Defense LP, former American defense company
United Dominica Labour Party